Main Solah Baras Ki is a 1998 Hindi-language film directed by Dev Anand. The film was unsuccessful at the box office.

Summary
The story portrays Dev Anand as a director who is looking for a new actress to star in his upcoming Bollywood movie. After finding no one in India, he continues his search in Europe primarily the U.K and Canada, finally, the U.S-United States, where he finds Madhu (played by Shaista Usta, an American of Middle Eastern, and South Asian (Northern Pakistan) descent, who speaks Indo-European as mother tongue, including several other languages. Usta stars in the lead title role and was given the stage name, Sabrina by the late Dev Anand in Bollywood Cinema. The story of the movie moves on with the love triangle between Suniel (Jas Arora, a former model turned fashion house) Madhu (Shaista Usta, a former lead actress turned professional industry makeup artist and beauty influencer) and Dev Anand.

Cast
Shaista Usta
Dev Anand
Jas Arora
Deepak Tijori
Neeru Bajwa
A. K. Hangal

Soundtrack 
Music Director : Rajesh Roshan
The song Zindagi ke sur se sur me gaye is a ghazal.

References

External links 

1998 films
1990s Hindi-language films
Films directed by Dev Anand
Films scored by Rajesh Roshan